The Great Train Robbery is a two-part British television miniseries, written by Chris Chibnall, that was first broadcast on BBC One on 18 and 19 December 2013.  The series is distributed worldwide by Kew Media.

It tells the story of the Great Train Robbery on 8 August 1963, first from the perspective of the robbers, and then from the perspective of the police. Episode one, A Robber's Tale, details the organisation of and successful completion of the robbery. Episode two, A Copper's Tale, follows the police investigation into the crime and subsequent arrest of many of the perpetrators. Coincidentally, the first part, A Robber's Tale, was shown on the same day that train robber Ronnie Biggs died.

Plot
A Robber's Tale is set between November 1962 and the aftermath of the Great Train Robbery on 8 August 1963. It begins in November 1962 at London Heathrow Airport where an earlier robbery took place, Bruce Reynolds (Luke Evans) then gathered a group of men to target the Royal Mail train heading between Glasgow and London.

A Copper's Tale begins in the early morning of 8 August 1963 after the train robbery took place. Six of the best police officers from Scotland Yard are called to help with the investigation, with DCS Tommy Butler (Jim Broadbent) in charge.

Cast

 Luke Evans as Bruce Reynolds
 Jim Broadbent as DCS Tommy Butler
 Paul Anderson as Gordon Goody
 Jack Roth as Charlie Wilson
 Martin Compston as Roy James
 Neil Maskell as Buster Edwards
 Del Synnott as Brian Field
 Nicholas Murchie as Roger Cordery
 Jordan Long as Tommy Wisbey
 Jack Gordon as Ronnie Biggs
 George Ward as Nick Reynolds
 Eric Hulme as Jack Mills
 James Bye as John Daly
 Robert Glenister as DI Frank Williams 
 Bethany Muir as Franny Reynolds
Olivia K Williams as Daughter of Charlie Wilson

A Robber's Tale
 John Voce as Billy Still
 Bill Thomas as Alf
 Nigel Collins as Bert Turner
 Dean Smith as David Whitby
 Mark Stratton as Mr. Wyatt

A Copper's Tale
 Ken Bones as Com. George Hatherill 
 Richard Hope as DCS Malcolm Fewtrell 
 George Costigan as DCS Ernie Millen 
 John Salthouse as DCI Sid Bradbury 
 Tim Pigott-Smith as DS Maurice Ray 
 Nick Moran as DS Jack Slipper
 Tom Chambers as DS Steve Moore
 Matthew Jure as DS Stanley Davies 
 James McGregor as DC Tommy Thorburn
 Tommy McDonnell as DC Keith Milner 
 Tom Beard as Dr. Ian Holden
 Christine Cox as Emily Clarke 
 Gwyneth Strong as Dorothy 
 James Wilby as John Wheater 
 James Fox as The Rt Hon Henry Brooke MP

Production
The Great Train Robbery was commissioned by Ben Stephenson, controller of BBC Drama, and Danny Cohen, controller of BBC One. The executive producers are Simon Heath for World Productions, the company behind the series, and Polly Hill for the BBC. Julia Stannard is the producer of the two ninety-minute films.

The two films were first due to be broadcast in August 2013, on the 50th anniversary of the train robbery, but was postponed to December 2013 because of scheduling issues. The production was inspired by the book Signal Red by Robert Ryan.

An arrangement of "Keep On Running", performed by Louise Mitchell, was played at the beginning and end of "A Robber's Tale". This song's chart-topping version, performed by The Spencer Davis Group, was used as the opening theme to Buster, the 1988 dramatisation of the Great Train Robbery.

Filming
Filming began in Yorkshire in March 2013. Various parts of Leeds city centre were used, such as the Adelphi public house, the Calls, Briggate, Hyde Park Picture House and other parts of Hyde Park. The Keighley and Worth Valley Railway was used as Sears Crossing, where the actual robbery took place. Other scenes were filmed at Bradford (City Hall entrance/main steps. Also at the end of part 2, the blue police light is placed where the actual police station was in City Hall originally), Shipley, Haworth and Goole. Filey was used instead of Torquay for the scenes involving Reynolds' hideout. According to the BBC, Yorkshire was the "most cost-effective and realistic alternative".

Episodes

Reception
According to Cheshire Today, the BBC was criticised for glorifying criminals when it announced the series.

Ratings
Overnight figures showed that A Robber's Tale, the first episode of The Great Train Robbery, was watched by 23.2% of the viewing audience for that time, with 5.23 million watching it. The second episode, A Copper's Tale, had a 23.1% audience share and 4.95 million viewers, according to overnight figures.

Critical reception
A Robber's Tale received a mixed response. Metro journalist Keith Watson gave the film two stars out of five and said he would have liked to have seen more background on the gang members. The Daily Telegraph Tom Rowley gave it four stars out of five and noted the high attention to detail by Chris Chibnall. Sam Wollaston from The Guardian said A Robber's Tale "beautifully explores the dynamic of a gang of men".

Awards
The Great Train Robbery received a BAFTA nomination in 2014.

Home media
The two films have been released on DVD by publisher Acorn Media UK and is available from the BBC. It was released at other outlets on 6 January 2014.

References

External links

Interview with Chris Chibnall about The Great Train Robbery

2013 British television series debuts
2013 British television series endings
2010s British crime drama television series
2010s British television miniseries
BBC crime drama television shows
BBC television miniseries
British television films
Television series by World Productions
English-language television shows
Television series set in 1963
Works by Chris Chibnall
2013 TV
Robbery in television
Television series set in the 1960s
Television shows set in England